Hexarthrius parryi, the fighting giant stag beetle, is a species of large stag beetles. It belongs to the genus Hexarthrius of the tribe Lucanini. It is classified under the subfamily Lucaninae of the stag beetle family Lucanidae.

Subspecies
The species is divided into the following subspecies:

Hexarthrius parryi deyrollei Parry, 1864 (Malaysia, Myanmar, Thailand)
Hexarthrius parryi elongatus Jordan, 1894 (Malaysia)
Hexarthrius parryi paradoxus Mollenkamp, 1898 (Java, Sumatra)
Hexarthrius parryi parryi Hope, 1842 (Bangladesh, Cambodia, India, Laos, Myanmar, Thailand, Viet Nam)

Description
Body is moderately elongate, not very shining, the basic color is black. Males have long jaws directed downward from the base, with bifurcated tips and a large yellow or bright orange patch occupying the posterior three-quarters of each elytron. The pronolum is short. The lateral angle of the prothorax is very sharp. The head is very broad, quite uneven and rugosely punctured. The mandibles are strongly curved, densely granular, with a sharp tooth directed upwards and another one directed downwards. The front tibia is finely serrated and the middle tibia has a strong lateral spine. The forewing shows a pair of brown spots.

Life cycle
Eggs are laid into rotten wood, sometimes into tunnels made by the females. Larvae feed on rotten wood. They become a pupa in the about 6–9 months. Adults emerge in about one month after pupation. Life of adults last about 6–8 months. They feed on sap and fruits.

Distribution
This species is present in the forests of Southeast Asia, Indonesia and India.

Gallery

See also
 Insect fighting

References

Lucaninae
Beetles described in 1842
Beetles of Asia